The Iron Curtain is a 1948 American thriller film starring Dana Andrews and Gene Tierney, directed by William A. Wellman.  The film was based on the memoirs of Igor Gouzenko.  Principal photography was done on location in Ottawa, Ontario, Canada by Charles G. Clarke.  The film was later re-released as Behind the Iron Curtain.

In Shostakovich v. Twentieth Century-Fox, Russian composer Dmitry Shostakovich unsuccessfully sued the film's distributor, Twentieth Century-Fox Film Corporation, in New York court, for using musical works of his that had fallen into the public domain.

Plot
Igor Gouzenko (Dana Andrews), an expert at deciphering codes, comes to the Soviet embassy in Ottawa in 1943, along with a Soviet military colonel, Trigorin (Frederic Tozere), and a major, Kulin (Eduard Franz), to set up a base of operations.

Warned of the sensitive and top-secret nature of his work, Igor is put to a test by his superiors, who have the seductive Nina Karanova (June Havoc) try her wiles on him. Igor proves loyal to not only the cause but to his wife, Anna (Gene Tierney), who arrives in Ottawa shortly thereafter with the news that she is pregnant.

Trigorin and his security chief, Ranov (Stefan Schnabel), meet with John Grubb (Berry Kroeger), the founder of Canada's branch of the Communist Party. One of their primary targets is uranium being used for atomic energy by Dr. Harold Norman (Nicholas Joy), whom they try to recruit.

In the years that pass, the atomic bomb ends the war. Anna, who has borne a son, now has serious doubts about the family's future. Igor begins to share these doubts, particularly after one of his colleagues, Kulin has a breakdown and is placed under arrest. Once Igor is told that he is going to be reassigned back to Moscow, he decides to take action. He takes secret documents from the Embassy and tells Anna to hide them, in case anything happens to him. Trigorin and Ranov threaten his life, and the lives of his and Anna's families in the Soviet Union, but Igor refuses to return the papers.

Grubb and several others are called back to the Soviet Union to answer for their failures. Canada's government places the Gouzenkos in protective custody and grants them residence. The film ends with the proviso that the family lives in hiding protected by the Royal Canadian Mounted Police. "Yet they have not lost faith in the future. They know that ultimate security for themselves and their children lies in the survival of the democratic way of life".

Cast
 Dana Andrews as Igor Gouzenko
 Gene Tierney as Anna Gouzenko
 June Havoc as Nina Karanova
 Berry Kroeger as John Grubb, aka 'Paul'
 Edna Best as Mrs. Albert Foster, neighbor
 Stefan Schnabel as Col. Ilya Ranov, embassy attache
 Eduard Franz as Maj. Semyon Kulin
 Nicholas Joy as Dr. Harold Preston Norman, aka 'Alec'
 Frederic Tozere as Col. Aleksandr Trigorin

Production
Twentieth Century-Fox bought the rights to Gouzenko's articles about his experiences as Hollywood began producing films regarding Communist infiltration in the late '40s. The studio also purchased the rights to two historical books on Soviet espionage, George Moorad's Behind the Iron Curtain and Richard Hirsch's The Soviet Spies: The Story of Russian Espionage in North America, though no material from the two books was actually used in the film.  The film was produced by Daryl F. Zanuck in response to claims by Rep. J. Parnell Thomas, chairman of the House Un-American Activities Committee, that Hollywood did not make anti-communist films.

Soviet sympathizers attempted unsuccessfully to disrupt location shooting in Ottawa, where Fox captured exteriors during a cold Canadian winter.

Reception
The New York Times noted the movie's release, stating:  "The Iron Curtain... has been under attack since January by various groups including the National Council of American-Soviet Friendship."

References

External links
 
 
 
 

1948 films
1940s spy thriller films
American spy thriller films
American anti-communist propaganda films
American black-and-white films
Cold War spy films
1940s English-language films
Films directed by William A. Wellman
Spy films based on actual events
20th Century Fox films
Films scored by Alfred Newman
Films set in the 1940s
1940s crime films
Films shot in Ontario
American biographical films
Works about Canada and the Cold War
1940s American films